Sam Page may refer to:

 Sam Jensen Page (born 1974), celebrity fitness coach and bodyguard in Los Angeles, California
 Sam Page (baseball) (1916–2002), Major League Baseball pitcher
 Sam Page (footballer) (born 1987), English footballer
 Sam Page (politician) (born 1965), American physician and politician
 Samuel Page (born 1976), American actor credited under the name Sam Page